Sacramento Air Logistics Center is a former United States Air Force unit based at McClellan Air Force Base from 1935 until its closure as part of the 1995 Base Realignment and Closure Commission.

History
Construction of the Pacific Air Depot began in 1935, and the main structures, including administrative buildings, barracks, warehouses and a hospital were completed on 18 April 1938. It was one of only four such air depots in the country. In 1938 the base was renamed Sacramento Air Depot and underwent a major expansion as a repair and overhaul facility for P-38 and P-39 fighter planes. The planes were serviced on an assembly line basis. In 1940, an assembly line was added to overhaul P-40 fighters.

In December 1941, soon after the attack on Pearl Harbor, P-40s as well as B-26 and B-17 bombers began arriving at the field to be armed and prepared for immediate shipment overseas. Some B-17s came direct to McClellan from the factories. During this time most of the Army Air Forces planes that went to the Pacific Theater were prepared at McClellan. In March 1942, Lieutenant Colonel Jimmy Doolittle's B-25s arrived at McClellan for arming in preparation for their famous Tokyo raid. The Doolittle Raiders practiced their aircraft carrier takeoff techniques at the Willows Airport in Glenn County, about 90 miles north on Highway 99: The airport runway was painted to represent the flight deck of the aircraft carrier .

During World War II, numerous planes arrived at McClellan from all over the U.S. to be armed and otherwise prepared for shipment overseas to combat areas. After the war McClellan became a storage center of several types of aircraft including B-29 bombers.

The base was renamed McClellan Air Force Base in 1948 and its repair and overhaul mission continued throughout the Cold War as an installation of the Air Force Logistics Command (AFLC) and later the Air Force Materiel Command (AFMC), with the overhaul facility being known as the Sacramento Air Logistics Center.

The SALC had the 2874th Test Squadron assigned to it from 15 January 1988 - 30 September 1992. It conducted flight tests on aircraft returning to active service after depot maintenance, modification, or repair.  In 1992, the squadron was consolidated with the 337th Tactical Fighter Squadron as the 337th Test Squadron. It was inactivated with the closure of McClellan AFB.

Throughout the 1980s and early 1990s, McClellan functioned as the main depot for overhauling the Air Force's General Dynamics F-111, FB-111 and EF-111 aircraft, as well as the Fairchild Republic A-10 Thunderbolt II aircraft. It also hosted a tenant WC-135 unit and supported the sophisticated electronic Operation Red Flag at Nellis AFB Nevada.  A small contingent of F-111D and F-111F aircraft of the 431st Test and Evaluation Squadron, 57 Fighter Weapons Wing, Nellis AFB Nevada was also detached to McClellan.

Previous names
 Pacific Air Depot, 1935 -  1 February 1937
 Sacramento Air Depot 1 February 1937 - 1 December 1939

Major command assignments 
 Materiel Division, United States Army Air Corps, 24 August 1938 - 11 December 1941
 Air Service Command, 11 December 1941 - 17 July 1944
 Army Air Forces Materiel and Services Command, 17 July 1944 - 31 August 1944
 Army Air Forces Technical Service Command, 31 August 1944 - 1 July 1945
 Air Technical Service Command, 1 July 1945 - 9 March 1946
 Air Materiel Command, 9 March 1946 - 1 April 1961
 Air Force Logistics Command, 1 April 1961 - 1 July 1992
 Air Force Materiel Command, 1 July 1992 - 13 July 2001

Further reading
Porter, "History of Sacramento Air Service Command"

External links

Information on the center

Logistics units and formations of the United States Air Force
Centers of the United States Air Force
Military units and formations disestablished in the 2000s
1935 establishments in California
History of Sacramento, California
History of Sacramento County, California
Military Superfund sites
Buildings and structures in Sacramento County, California